Charles Walsh may refer to:

Charles Francis Walsh (1877–1912), American aviator
Charles Hamilton Walsh (1820–1874), Australian politician
Charles J. Walsh (1816–1897), Santa Clara University president